Events in the year 1950 in West Germany and East Germany.

Incumbents

West Germany
President –  Theodor Heuss
Chancellor –  Konrad Adenauer

East Germany
Head of State – Wilhelm Pieck
Head of Government – Otto Grotewohl

Events 
 June 5 - German broadcaster ARD started.
 July 6 - Treaty of Zgorzelec was signed between the Republic of Poland and East Germany (GDR).
 October 5-9 - Himmerod memorandum
 October 19 - East German general election, 1950

Births 
January 9 - Rio Reiser, singer (died 1996)
January 21 - Marion Becker, athlete
January 22 - Werner Schulz, politician (died 2022)
January 27 - Ulrich Deppendorf, journalist
January 30 - Reinhold Kauder, canoeist
February 2 - Barbara Sukowa, actress
February 8 - Manfred Milinski, biologist
March 6 - Felix Genn, German bishop of Roman Catholic Church
March 22 - Hugo Egon Balder, actor and comedian
March 22  - Herman Weigel, German film producer
April 25 - Peter Hintze, German politician (died 2016)
April 30 - Christine Hohmann-Dennhardt, German judge
May 12 - Renate Stecher, athlete
May 16 - Georg Bednorz, physicist
May 18 - Thomas Gottschalk, actor and television presenter
May 26 - Werner Bergmann, sociologist
June 16 - Klaus Lage, singer
June 21 - Ferdinand Kirchhof, judge
June 20 - Gudrun Landgrebe, actress
July 7 - Gerda Hasselfeldt, politician
July 27- David Storl, track and field athlete who specialises in the shot put
August 5 - Rosi Mittermaier, alpine ski racer (died 2023)
August 12 – Iris Berben, actress
September 2 - Michael Rother, musician
September 23 - Dietmar Lorenz, judoka
October 13 - Annegret Richter, athlete
October 28 - Annette Humpe, singer
November 10 - Bernd-Ulrich Hergemöller, historian
November 17 - Roland Matthes, swimmer
November 28 - Hans Fassnacht, swimmer

Deaths

References

 
1950s in Germany
Years of the 20th century in Germany
Germany
Germany